Borzym is a Polish surname. Notable people with the surname include:

Hans-Joachim Borzym (born 1948), East German rower 
Monika Borzym (born 1990), Polish jazz singer

See also
 

Polish-language surnames